Gary Basaraba (born March 16, 1959) is a Canadian actor. He appeared as Sergeant Richard Santoro on Steven Bochco's Brooklyn South and Officer Ray Hechler on the critically acclaimed but short-lived Boomtown. He has worked for Martin Scorsese three times, first in The Last Temptation of Christ and then The Irishman and Killers of the Flower Moon.

Career
In 1985 he appeared in the film One Magic Christmas with Mary Steenburgen. In 1987, he appeared in the episodes "Duty and Honor" (3x15) and "Honor Among Thieves" (4x16) of the cult TV series Miami Vice.

Basaraba played Heywood Broun, one of the greatest American journalists of the 20th century, in Mrs. Parker and the Vicious Circle in 1994, and in 1996 appeared as Alberto in Striptease. He played Sheriff Grady Kilgore in Fried Green Tomatoes. He also played Saint Andrew in The Last Temptation of Christ, and had a role in Sweet Dreams.

In 2001 he had the lead role in Recipe for Murder.

Basaraba portrayed the father, Jack Grainger, in One Magic Christmas, opposite Mary Steenburgen, and played Homer Zuckerman in the remake of Charlotte's Web. Since 2007, he has appeared in the Canadian television series Mixed Blessings.

Basaraba has also made four appearances in the Law & Order franchise, as a bartender in the original series episode titled "Point of View", as a corrections officer in the Law & Order episode "The Brotherhood" in 2004, as well as in the SVU episodes entitled "Parasites", as the husband of a woman who has gone missing, and "Caretaker" as a defense attorney.

In 2010, he played the role of Jimmy Burke in After Hours, the tenth episode of the first season of the CBS police procedural drama Blue Bloods.

Basaraba also played the role of Herb Rennet in the television series Mad Men. He was also the voice of Hefty Smurf in the live-action/CG family film The Smurfs. In 2015, he played the role of Neil on an episode of The Leftovers. In 2016, he played the role of Don in The Accountant.

In the Martin Scorsese 2019 epic crime film The Irishman, Basaraba played Frank "Fitz" Fitzsimmons, who was the acting president of the International Brotherhood of Teamsters from 1967 to 1971, and president from 1971 to 1981.

Filmography

Film

Television

References

External links

1959 births
Canadian male film actors
Canadian male television actors
Canadian male voice actors
Living people
Male actors from Edmonton
Yale School of Drama alumni
Canadian people of Scottish descent
Canadian people of Ukrainian descent